The Buchtel College of Arts and Sciences is the largest college of the University of Akron, located in Akron, Ohio.

History
The Buchtel College of Arts and Sciences traces its origins back to 1870 with Buchtel College, which was the progenitor to the University of Akron.  It is named after John R. Buchtel.

Academic programs
The college offers more than 30 undergraduate majors, nearly 20 master's degrees, and 8 doctoral programs.

Also within the Buchtel College of Arts and Sciences is the Ray C. Bliss Institute of Applied Politics, which is directed by John C. Green.

References

External links
The Buchtel College of Arts and Sciences at the University of Akron

Educational institutions established in 1870
Butchel 
1870 establishments in Ohio